In the 2019–20 season, Espérance Sportive de Tunis competed in the Ligue 1 for the 65th season, as well as the Tunisian Cup.  It was their 65th consecutive season in the top flight of Tunisian football. They competed in Ligue 1, the Champions League, the Arab Club Champions Cup, the FIFA Club World Cup, the CAF Super Cup and the Tunisian Cup.

Squad list
Players and squad numbers last updated on 18 November 2019.Note: Flags indicate national team as has been defined under FIFA eligibility rules. Players may hold more than one non-FIFA nationality.

Pre-season

Competitions

Overview

{| class="wikitable" style="text-align: center"
|-
!rowspan=2|Competition
!colspan=8|Record
!rowspan=2|Started round
!rowspan=2|Final position / round
!rowspan=2|First match
!rowspan=2|Last match
|-
!
!
!
!
!
!
!
!
|-
| Ligue 1

| 
| style="background:gold;"| Winners
| 24 August 2019
| 13 September 2020
|-
| Tunisian Cup

| Round of 32
| style="background:silver;"| Runners–up
| 11 March 2020
| 27 September 2020
|-
| Super Cup

| Final
| style="background:gold;"| Winners
| colspan=2| 20 September 2020
|-
| CAF Super Cup

| Final
| style="background:silver;"| Runners–up
| colspan=2| 14 February 2020
|-
| Champions League

| First round
| Quarter-finals
| 15 September 2019
| 6 March 2020
|-
| Club Champions Cup

| First round
| Second round
| 20 August 2019
| 23 November 2019
|-
| FIFA Club World Cup

| Second round
| Fifth place
| 14 December 2019
| 17 December 2019
|-
! Total

Ligue 1

League table

Results summary

Results by round

Matches

Tunisian Cup

Tunisian Super Cup

CAF Super Cup

FIFA Club World Cup

Champions League

First round

Group stage

Group D

knockout stage

Quarter-finals

Club Championship Cup

First round

Second round

Squad information

Playing statistics

|-
! colspan=16 style=background:#dcdcdc; text-align:center| Goalkeepers

|-
! colspan=16 style=background:#dcdcdc; text-align:center| Defenders

|-
! colspan=16 style=background:#dcdcdc; text-align:center| Midfielders

|-
! colspan=16 style=background:#dcdcdc; text-align:center| Forwards

|-
! colspan=16 style=background:#dcdcdc; text-align:center| Players transferred out during the season

Goalscorers
Includes all competitive matches. The list is sorted alphabetically by surname when total goals are equal.

Transfers

In

Out

Notes

References

2019-20
Tunisian football clubs 2019–20 season
2019–20 CAF Champions League participants seasons
Esperance